Pier Silvio Berlusconi (born 28 April 1969) is an Italian entrepreneur in the media business. He is the son of the former Italian prime minister Silvio Berlusconi and his first wife Carla Lucia Elvira Dall'Oglio.

He has one older sister, Maria Elvira "Marina" (born in 1966) and three younger half-siblings from his father's second marriage (Barbara, Eleonora and Luigi).

Since 1992 Berlusconi held several positions at Mediaset, the Italian commercial television network founded by his father, Silvio Berlusconi, and now controlled by the Berlusconi family through Fininvest.

In November 1996 he was appointed director of scheduling and programme coordination for Mediaset's three channels. In April 2000 he became deputy chairman of the Mediaset Group and chairman and chief executive of RTI and Med Due Srl. He is also a member of the Boards of Directors of Fininvest SpA, Gestevision Telecinco SA, Medusa Film Sp., Arnoldo Mondadori Editore SpA and Publitalia '80 SpA.

He has a daughter, Lucrezia Vittoria (born in 1990), with model Emanuela Mussida. Since 2002 he is a relationship with TV presenter Silvia Toffanin with whom he had two children, Lorenzo Mattia (born in 2010) and Sofia Valentina (born in 2015).

References

Italian mass media owners
Pier Silvio
1969 births
Living people
Children of national leaders
Fininvest
Mediaset